Live at the Telluride Bluegrass Festival is the first live album by the San Francisco, California-based band New Monsoon. It was recorded live on June 17, 2004 at the venerable Telluride Bluegrass Festival. It was released on March 15, 2005.

Track listing
 Mountain Air – 11:37
 Painted Moon – 9:09
 Calypso – 8:52
 Blue Queen – 5:48
 Daddy Long Legs – 5:59
 Rock Springs Road – 5:25
 Velvet Pouch – 8:19
 Tabla Solo – 2:58
 Bridge of the Gods – 9:22

Personnel
New Monsoon:
Benjamin Bernstein – bass
Brian Carey – percussion, conga, vocals
Phil Ferlino – keyboards, vocals
Rajiv Parikh – percussion, tabla, vocals
Bo Carper – acoustic guitar, banjo, vocals
Michael Shrieve – percussion
Marty Ylitalo – drums, didjeridu

Clay Brasher – package design, package concept  
Cookie Marenco – editing, mastering

External links
New Monsoon Merchandise
[ All Music entry]

New Monsoon albums
2004 live albums
Telluride, Colorado